The Afghanistan A cricket team is a national cricket team representing Afghanistan.  It is the 'second-tier' of international Afghan cricket, below the full Afghanistan national cricket team.  Matches played by Afghanistan A are not considered to be One Day Internationals, instead receiving List A classification. Their first match was against the Tajikistan national cricket team in December 2013. In 2017, they played a five-match series against the Zimbabwe A cricket team in Zimbabwe.

In July 2017, they were added to the South Africa A Team Tri-Series, after Australia A withdrew. They toured Bangladesh in July 2019, playing two first-class and five 50-over matches against Bangladesh A.

References

National sports teams of Afghanistan
Afghanistan in international cricket
National 'A' cricket teams
2013 establishments in Afghanistan
Cricket clubs established in 2013